Lena Miculek is an American practical sport shooter who took gold medal at the 2017 IPSC Rifle World Shoot in the Open division, Lady category, and three gold medals in the IPSC Shotgun Standard division, Lady category, from the 2012, 2015 and 2018 IPSC Shotgun World Shoot. She is the daughter of IPSC Revolver World Champion Jerry Miculek and Handgun Lady Open Champion Kay Clark Miculek, whose brother was the gunsmith Jim Clark of Clark Custom Guns. Miculek has competed since she was eight years old and started competing actively in 2011.

See also 
 Maria Gushchina, Russian sport shooter
 Ashley Rheuark, American sport shooter

References

External links 
 miculek.com - The official webpage of Team Miculek
 Results from the 2018 Shotgun World Shoot, France

IPSC shooters
IPSC World Shoot Champions
Living people
1995 births